Robert Brown  was an American shortstop  in the National Association for the 1874 Baltimore Canaries. In 9 at-bats, Brown compiled no hits. Brown played his 2 career games at the shortstop position and committed 3 errors in 11 total chances.

External links

Major League Baseball shortstops
19th-century baseball players
Baltimore Canaries players